or  (also unofficially Uuniemi in Kven) is a municipality in Troms og Finnmark county, Norway. The administrative centre of the municipality is the village of Varangerbotn. Other villages in Nesseby include Gandvik, Karlebotn, Nesseby, and Nyelv. The European route E06 and European route E75 highways intersect at Varangerbotn in Nesseby.

The  municipality is the 62nd largest by area out of the 356 municipalities in Norway. Nesseby is the 343rd most populous municipality in Norway with a population of 854.

On 1 January 2020, the municipality became part of the newly formed Troms og Finnmark county. Previously, it had been part of the old Finnmark county.

Name
The official name of the municipality was Nesseby before 1989 when it was changed to Unjárga-Nesseby. It was the second municipality in Norway to get a Sami name. In 2005, the name was again changed, such that either Unjárga or Nesseby can be used.

The municipality (originally the parish) is named after the old Nesseby farm, since Nesseby Church was built there (in 1858). The first element is nes which means "headland" and the last element is by which means "town".

The meaning of the first element (u-) in the Sami name is unknown and the last element is njárga which means "headland".

Coat of arms
The coat of arms was granted on 27 June 1986. The official blazon is "Gules, a cloudberry plant Or couped at base". This means the arms have a red field (background) and the charge is a cloudberry plant (Rubus chamaemorus). The cloudberry plant has a tincture of Or which means it is commonly colored yellow, but if it is made out of metal, then gold is used. Cloudberry plants are commonly found in the municipality and the Finnmark region, growing in marshes and wet fields. The berries are collected and eaten locally as well as commercially exported to other parts of Norway. The berries are at first red, but when ripe they get a golden or orange colour, so the colour combination of yellow and red was used on the arms to represent this. The arms were designed by Arvid Sveen.

History

Wild reindeer used to cross the isthmus in prehistoric times until the year 1900, causing extensive human activity throughout the millennia. Therefore, the area is full of archeological finds from different periods.

The municipality of Nesseby was originally established in 1839 when the western part of the Vadsø landdistrikt was separated to form Nesseby. Initially, there were 598 residents. This was short-lived, however, since the two were merged back together in 1858. On 1 January 1864, the municipality of Nesseby was again created from the western district of Vadsø landdistrikt. The initial population (this time) was 886. The western part of Nesseby (population: 450) was separated on 1 January 1903 to form the new municipality of Polmak.

Economy
In 2013, 26% of jobs of were within the health sector and social sector; 8% were within education; there were 373 jobs in the municipality. The hydroelectric power station, Gandvik kraftverk produces [around]  (as of 2021).

Geography
The municipality is situated on the isthmus between the Varangerfjord and the Tana River at the entrance to the Varanger Peninsula. All the people live in small settlements along the fjord. Varangerhalvøya National Park is partially located in the park. The river Jakobselva partially forms the municipal border between Nesseby and Vadsø to the northeast.

Birdlife
The municipality of Unjárga-Nesseby is known for its interesting birding localities and is mentioned in several birding guide books. Other than the Varangerford, the main habitat is tundra with areas of bog and marsh. One species that can usually be seen on small ponds during the summer months is the red-necked phalarope.

Climate

Government
All municipalities in Norway, including Nesseby, are responsible for primary education (through 10th grade), outpatient health services, senior citizen services, unemployment and other social services, zoning, economic development, and municipal roads. The municipality is governed by a municipal council of elected representatives, which in turn elect a mayor.  The municipality falls under the Indre Finnmark District Court and the Hålogaland Court of Appeal.

Municipal council
The municipal council  of Nesseby is made up of 15 representatives that are elected to four year terms. The party breakdown of the council is as follows:

Mayors
The mayors of Nesseby:

1846–1847: Jørris Schelderup Hansen 
1848–1849: Johan Christian Astrup 
1849–1850: Jørris Schelderup Hansen 
1850–1853: Christian Sommerfelt 
1854-1854: Carl Johan Scanche 
1855-1855: Christian Andreassen 
1855–1856: Christian Sommerfelt 
1856–1857: Christian Andreassen 
1857–1859: Carl Johan Scanche 
1859–1860: Andreas Nordvi
1863-1863: Hieronymus Heyerdahl
1865–1876: Otto Andreas Pleym, Sr.
1877–1879: Olaf Olafsen Lassen 
1880-1880: Otto Andreas Pleym, Sr. 
1881–1898: Johan Bjørvik Jacobsen
1899–1904: Otto Andreas Pleym, Jr.
1905–1913: Anton Olsen Hoem
1914–1915: Isak Saba (Ap)
1916–1925: Kristian Martin Andersen
1926–1931: Erling Hoem 
1932–1934: Bernhard Haldorsen Skauge 
1935–1937: Herman Anton Losvik 
1938–1940: Julius Herman Endresen 
1944–1945: Sverre Oskar Raddum 
1945-1945: Julius Herman Endresen 
1946–1950: Andreas Gustav Adolf Berg 
1951–1954: Mathis Johan Saba 
1954-1954: Julius Leonhard Johansen	
1955-1955: Per Nilsen Balk
1956–1959: Truls Holm	
1959-1959: Johan Petter Store
1960–1961: Einar Leonhard Samuelsen 	
1962–1967: Per Nilsen Balk 
1968–1971: Otto Bjørvik Pleym (H)
1972–1975: Johan Per Erik Store (Ap)
1976–1979: Einar Rudolf Johansen (Ap)
1980–1983: Øystein Nilsen (Sp)
1984–1987: Einar Rudolf Johansen (Ap)
1988–1989: Thore Andreas Sundfær (Ap)
1990–1991: Mari-Ann Nilssen (H)
1991–1999: Jarle-Wilfred Andreassen (Ap)
1999–2003: Thore Andreas Sundfær (Ap)
2003–2007: Ann-Jorid Henriksen (Ap)
2007–2011: Inger Katrine Juuso (Ap)
2011–present: Knut Inge Store (Ap)

Culture

Sami culture
Most inhabitants are of Sami origin, and today Sami is being taught as the first language in schools. The municipality has its own Sami costume.

A survey conducted on behalf of the Sami Language Council in the year 2000 showed that 75 percent of the population are Sami speakers.

The Norwegian Sami Parliament's department of culture and environment is located in Unjárga-Nesseby. The Várjjat Sámi Museum is located in the municipality. The museum is about the sea-sami culture. Unjárga-Nesseby is also the birthplace of Isak Saba the first Sami to be elected into the Norwegian Parliament.

The popular teen-age pop-band The Blacksheeps come from Nesseby.

Churches
The Church of Norway has one parish within the municipality of Nesseby. It is part of the Indre Finnmark prosti (deanery) in the Diocese of Nord-Hålogaland.

Notable people

 Søren Kristian Sommerfelt (1851–1934), Lutheran priest
 Anathon Aall (1867–1943), academic, philosopher and psychologist
 Isak Saba (1874–1921), the first Sami to be elected to the Stortinget 
 Finn Lützow-Holm (1890–1950), military officer, aviation pioneer and polar explorer
 Anton Johnson Brandt (1893–1951), veterinarian and academic
 Signe Iversen (born 1956), Sami-language consultant and author of children's literature
 Raimo Valle (born 1965), civil servant and politician for the Labour Party
 Silje Karine Muotka (born 1975), member of the Sami Parliament of Norway
 Kirsti Bergstø (born 1981), politician for the Socialist Left Party
 Agnete Johnsen (born 1994), musician and lead singer of The BlackSheeps

References

External links

 http://www.nesseby.kommune.no/ Official homepage 
Municipal fact sheet from Statistics Norway 
 http://www.varjjat.org/ Várjjat Sámi Museum 
 http://www.isaksaba.no/ Isak Saba center 

 
Municipalities of Troms og Finnmark
Sámi-language municipalities
Populated places of Arctic Norway
1839 establishments in Norway
1858 disestablishments in Norway
1864 establishments in Norway